Lycus or Lykos, in Greek mythology, was a king of Libya and son of the god Ares and the father of Callirhoê.

Mythology 
Lycus had the custom of sacrificing strangers to his father. After the sack of Troy, Diomedes was cast up on the Libyan coast and when he was being sacrificed, the king's daughter Callirhoê fell in love with the hero and betrayed her father. She loosened Diomedes from his bonds and rescued him eventually, but committed suicide upon his departure.

Notes

References 

 Gaius Julius Hyginus, Fabulae from The Myths of Hyginus translated and edited by Mary Grant. University of Kansas Publications in Humanistic Studies. Online version at the Topos Text Project.
 Lucius Mestrius Plutarchus, Moralia with an English Translation by Frank Cole Babbitt. Cambridge, MA. Harvard University Press. London. William Heinemann Ltd. 1936. Online version at the Perseus Digital Library. Greek text available from the same website.

Children of Ares
Demigods in classical mythology
Libyan characters in Greek mythology